Plain-an-Gwarry is a hamlet in the west of Redruth, Cornwall, England, UK. The name derives from Cornish plen an gwari (meaning "playing place"), an open-air performance area used historically for entertainment and instruction.

References

Hamlets in Cornwall